Xylotype capax, known generally as the broad sallow moth or barrens xylotype, is a species of cutworm or dart moth in the family Noctuidae. It is found in North America.

The MONA or Hodges number for Xylotype capax is 9979.

References

Further reading

 
 
 

Xylenini
Articles created by Qbugbot
Moths described in 1868